Peter Shapiro is a freelance music journalist, who has written for Spin, URB, Music Week, Uncut, Vibe, The Wire and The Times.

Literary works
The Rough Guide to Hip-hop
The Rough Guide to Soul and R'n'B 	
The Rough Guide to Drum 'n' BassTurn The beat around: The Secret History of Disco
Modulations A History of Electronic Music Throbbing Words on Sound (ed.) (2000)

References

External links
Peter Shapiro on the 'roots' of Euro-Disco
2003 Pazz & Jop  ballot
2002 Pazz & Jop  ballot
2001 Pazz & Jop  ballot

Living people
Year of birth missing (living people)
British music journalists
The Wire (magazine) writers